The 1961–62 season was the 59th season of competitive football in Belgium. RCS Anderlechtois won their 9th Division I title. Standard Liège entered the 1961–62 European Champion Clubs' Cup as Belgian title holder and became the first Belgian club to reach the semifinals of this competition. RU Saint-Gilloise entered the 1961–62 Inter-Cities Fairs Cup. The Belgium national football team finished their unsuccessful 1962 FIFA World Cup qualification campaign with a loss and played 7 friendly matches (5 wins, 2 losses).

Overview
At the end of the season, K Waterschei SV Thor Genk and KSC Eendracht Aalst were relegated to Division II and were replaced in Division I by R Berchem Sport and K Beringen FC from Division II.
The bottom 2 clubs in Division II (K Sint-Niklaasse SK and RRC Tournaisien) were relegated to Division III, to be replaced by KRC Mechelen and R Crossing Club Molenbeek from Division III.
The bottom club of each Division III league (RUS Tournaisienne, Kontich FC, R Fléron FC and Aarschot Sport) were relegated to the Promotion, to be replaced by VC Zwevegem Sport, FC Vigor Hamme, R Stade Waremmien FC and FC Eendracht Houthalen from Promotion.

National team

* Belgium score given first

Key
 H = Home match
 A = Away match
 N = On neutral ground
 F = Friendly
 WCQ = World Cup qualification
 o.g. = own goal

European competitions
Standard Liège qualified for the first round of the 1961–62 European Champion Clubs' Cup by defeating Fredrikstad FK of Norway (wins 2-1 at home and 0-2 away) in the preliminary round. They then eliminated successively FC Haka of Finland (wins 5-1 at home and 0-2 away) and Rangers of Scotland (win 4-1 at home and defeat 2-0 away) to reach the semifinals. At this stage of the competition, Standard lost to Real Madrid (losses 4-0 away and 0-2 at home).

RU Saint-Gilloise lost in the first round of the 1961–62 Inter-Cities Fairs Cup to Hearts of Scotland (losses 1-3 at home and defeat 2-0 away).

Honours

Final league tables

Premier Division

 1961-62 Top scorer: Jacques Stockman (RSC Anderlechtois) with 29 goals.
 1961 Golden Shoe: Paul Van Himst (RSC Anderlechtois)

References